The Gentleman Usher of the Scarlet Rod is the Gentleman Usher to the Most Honourable Order of the Bath, established 14 January 1726. 

The Brunswick Herald, an officer of arms of the Order of the Bath, was annexed with the position at the time it was established. The office lapsed  in 1857 when the Order of the Bath was remodelled. The Brunswick Herald was not part of the College of Arms, although the final four officer holders were officers in ordinary of the college. The heraldic badge of the enamelled with the arms of the Braunschweig (Brunswick) family, Gules, two lions passant guardant or.

Office Holders from 1725
1725 – ?: Edmund Sawyer
bef. 1763 – aft. 1789: Henry Hill
bef. 1806 – 2 July 1814: Sir Isaac Heard
2 July 1814 – 1841: George Frederick Beltz
2 December 1841 – 1857?: Albert William Woods
1857? – 18 May 1863: Hon. Frederick Arthur Henry Chichester
1863–1911?: Charles George Barrington
vacant?
7 March 1913 – 30 March 1928: Colonel Sir Charles Wyndham Murray
30 March 1928 – 15 November 1932: Admiral Richard Grenville Arthur Wellington Stapleton-Cotton
15 November 1932 – 14 May 1948: Air Vice Marshal Sir Charles Alexander Holcombe Longcroft
14 May 1948 – 12 March 1954: Major General Douglas Neil Wimberley
12 March 1954 – 17 July 1964: Rear Admiral Robert St Vincent Sherbrooke
25 September 1964 – 3 August 1979: Air Marshal Sir Anthony Dunkerton Selway
9 February 1968 – 3 August 1979: Rear Admiral Colin Duncan Madden
3 August 1979 – 1985: Air Marshal Sir Denis Crowley-Milling
19 August 1985 – 18 July 1990: Rear Admiral David Edward Macey
18 July 1990 – 13 September 2001: Air Vice Marshal Sir Richard Charles Fairfax Peirse
15 March 2002 – 13 June 2006 : Rear Admiral Iain Henderson (appointment dated from 13 September 2001)
13 June 2006 – 15 July 2018 : Major General Charles Vyvyan
16 July 2018 - present : Major General James Gordon

References

Order of the Bath
Ceremonial officers in the United Kingdom
1725 establishments in Great Britain